Damon Centola is a sociologist and the Elihu Katz Professor of Communication, Sociology and Engineering at the University of Pennsylvania, where he is Director of the Network Dynamics Group and Senior Fellow at the Leonard Davis Institute of Health Economics. 

Before joining the University of Pennsylvania, Centola was an assistant professor at MIT Sloan School of Management (2008–2013) and a Robert Wood Johnson Fellow at Harvard University.

Career
Centola works on complex contagions, collective intelligence, and experimental sociology. Complex contagions was the topic of his Ph.D. dissertation in sociology, supervised by Michael Macy at Cornell University.  After completing his doctorate degree at Cornell, Damon spent two years as a Robert Wood Johnson Postdoctoral Fellow in Health Policy at Harvard University. He then joined the faculty of the Sloan School of Management at MIT in 2008. In 2013, he moved to the University of Pennsylvania's Annenberg School for Communications and founded the Network Dynamics Group as a center for theoretical research with testable policy applications.

Complex contagions

Centola and Macy found that information and disease spread as "simple contagions", requiring only one contact for transmission, while behaviors typically spread as "complex contagions", requiring multiple sources of reinforcement to induce adoption.  Centola's work builds on Granovetter's work on the strength of weak ties and threshold models of collective behavior, as well as Duncan Watts and Steve Strogatz's work on small world networks. Centola and Macy show that the weak ties and small worlds networks are both very good for spreading simple contagions. However, for complex contagions, weak ties and small worlds can slow diffusion. Centola used a network-based experimental method to test the theory of complex contagions  and showed that predictions were confirmed.

Centola's work on complex contagions also explores the importance of peer homophily and structural diversity in the process of spreading behaviors.

Experimental sociology 

Centola pioneered the use of large scale online networks as an experimental tool for identifying the dynamics of social change. To test the theory of complex contagions, Centola developed the method of "Internet Network Experiments", in which he constructed social networks within proprietary online communities to study how an innovation would propagate.

Centola's first experimental sociology study conducted at Harvard University in 2010, called "The Healthy Lifestyle Network", constructed 12 independent online communities. This experiment showed that experimentally controlled variations in the structure of a network could control how far and how fast an innovation would spread. This was the first study to demonstrate the causal effects of network structure on the spread of behavior.

In 2011, Centola showed that the same method could be used to causally identify the effects of network homophily on the spread of health innovations.

In 2015, he showed that this method could also be used to identify the causal effects of network structure in controlling the spontaneous emergence of new social norms.

In a series of subsequent studies, he showed that the same method could be used to identify the causal effects of social networks on the creation of collective intelligence, the emergence of political polarization, and the identification of an exact "tipping point" for overturning an established social norm.

Collective intelligence 

In 2017, Centola and his graduate students Joshua Becker and Devon Brackbill found that the "wisdom of the crowd" could be improved by using communication networks and that the structure of the social network changed the intelligence of the group.

Decentralized networks, in which everyone had the same number of connections and same level of influence, consistently produced group judgements that were more accurate than the standard "wisdom of the crowd".  Centralized networks did not create these improvements because they gave a central, highly connected person more influence.  Because of this disproportionate influence, they found that any errors by the central person would make the entire group underperform.

In subsequent studies, Centola and his graduate students Doug Guilbeault and Joshua Becker showed that the same networked collective intelligence process worked to improve group judgements, even when participants initially had strong partisan biases.

Norms and tipping points 

In 2015, Centola and physicist Andrea Baronchelli showed that the network structure of an online community can control the ability for people to converge on a shared social norm.

Centola and his team then used the same empirical design in 2018 to test Centola's theory of critical mass. Centola's theory predicted and showed that 25% of people need to adopt a new social norm to create an inflection point where everyone in the group follows. Results showed that by getting above the 25% tipping point, a committed minority can have rapid success in changing an entire population's opinion.

Awards

Damon Centola received the American Sociological Association's (ASA) 2017 James Coleman Award for Outstanding Article by the Rationality and Society Section, and the 2018 Best Paper Award at the International Conference on Computational Social Science.

He received The American Sociological Association's (ASA) Award for Outstanding Article in Mathematical Sociology in 2006, 2009, and 2011, and was awarded the ASA's 2011 Goodman Prize for Outstanding Contributions to Sociological Methodology.

References

External links
GoogleScholar

Scientists from Philadelphia
University of Pennsylvania faculty
Harvard University faculty
MIT Sloan School of Management faculty
1973 births
Cornell University alumni
Living people
American sociologists
Tufts University alumni